Khirbat Qumbaza was a Palestinian Arab village in the Haifa Subdistrict, located 21.5 km south of Haifa, 3 km away from Wadi al-Milh. It was depopulated during the 1948 Arab-Israeli War in May 1948.

History
One km to the southeast of the village site lay the maqam of Shaykh Quttayna, just below Khirbat Quttayna. Khirbat Quttayna has been identified by some scholars as the Canaanite place Kartah.

In the 1882, the PEF's  Survey of Western Palestine described Khirbat Qumbaza as "a small hamlet on high ground".

British Mandate era
In the 1931 census of Palestine, conducted by the British Mandate authorities, Khirbat Qumbaza was counted with Ijzim, Khirbat Al-Manara, Al-Mazar, Shaykh al-Burayk and al-Washahiyya. Together they had a population of 2160; 88 Christians and the rest Muslim, in a total of 442 houses.

1948 and aftermath
In July 1948, the IDF found hundreds of women, children and old people at Ijzim and nearby Khirbat Qumbaza. "More than 100" Arabs were reported killed, and about 100 militiamen were taken prisoners. Following the war the area was incorporated into the State of Israel, and according to Walid Khalidi, writing in 1992, some of the village's land was used by the Israeli army as military training ground, while the moshav of Kerem Maharal was close to the old village site.

References

Bibliography

 Cited in Khalidi, 1992.

External links
Welcome To Qumbaza, Khirbat
Khirbat Qumbaza, Zochrot
Survey of Western Palestine, Map 8: IAA, Wikimedia commons
Qumbaza, from the Khalil Sakakini Cultural Center

Arab villages depopulated during the 1948 Arab–Israeli War
District of Haifa